The ICC World XI is a team chosen by the International Cricket Council (ICC), first selected (for a Twenty20 International (T20I)) for the 2017 Independence Cup tour of Pakistan in September 2017. The ICC World XI played three T20I matches against Pakistan in this series, which was seen by the ICC as a step towards the return of international cricket to Pakistan who have been forced to play most of their home matches in the United Arab Emirates since a terror attack on the Sri Lanka team bus during a Test match in March 2009. Six security men and two civilians were killed, as well as some Sri Lankan players being injured, which resulted in the match and series being abandoned. Since then, the only international cricket played in Pakistan had been a three-match One Day International series and two T20Is between Pakistan and Zimbabwe in 2015. Pakistan won the Independence Cup by two matches to one.

A World XI played a T20I against the West Indies at Lord's on 31 May 2018. The match was held as a fundraiser to aid restoration efforts in parts of the Caribbean hit by Hurricanes Irma and Maria in September 2017. Restoration of the cricket grounds in Dominica and Anguilla was identified as a particular target.

A World XI was scheduled to play two T20I matches in April 2020 against an Asia XI in Dhaka, to celebrate the birth centenary of Sheikh Mujibur Rahman, the founder of Bangladesh. However, on 11 March 2020, the matches were deferred until further notice due to the COVID-19 pandemic.

This is a list of players that have played in at least one T20I match for the World XI, and is arranged in the order in which each player won his first T20I cap for the side. In cases in which more than one player won his first T20I cap for the World XI in the same match, these players are listed alphabetically by surname. All of these players have also represented their respective national teams, but only their records in games played for the ICC World XI are given.



Key

Players
Statistics are correct as of 31 May 2018

See also 
 Twenty20 International
 List of World XI Test cricketers
 List of World XI ODI cricketers

References

World XI